Shawn Sides is a co-producing artistic director of Rude Mechanicals alongside fellow actress (and also fellow artistic director in the same troupe) Lana Lesley (incidentally, both Sides and Lesley also appeared in Nadia: The Secret of Blue Water.) She is also an American voice actress notable for the work she did for ADV Films now-defunct Monster Island Studio in Austin, Texas from 1998 through 2005.

Filmography

Anime roles 
801 T.T.S. Airbats - Sakura Saginomiya
Adventures of Kotetsu - Miho Kuon
Devil Lady - Jun Fudou/Devil Lady
Final Fantasy: Unlimited - Lisa Pacifist
Happy Lesson - Fumitsuki Nanakorobi
Lost Universe - Merina
Magical Play - Ketchup
Magical Play 3D - Ketchup
My Dear Marie - Human Marie
Nadia: The Secret of Blue Water - King
Nadia of the Mysterious Seas - King (Flashback Scenes)
Petite Princess Yucie - Chawoo (Chow)
Wedding Peach - Marilyn 
Zone of the Enders - Additional voices
Zone of the Enders: Idolo - Additional voices

Video Game roles 
DC Universe Online - Fire

References

External links
 Rude Mechanicals Home Page
 

American video game actresses
American voice actresses
Living people
Year of birth missing (living people)
20th-century American actresses
21st-century American actresses